Osiride Pevarello (26 July 1920 – 15 December 2016) was an Italian actor.

Selected filmography

The Mill on the Po (1949)
Gladiators Seven (1964) - Gladiator (uncredited)
The Triumph of Hercules (1964) - Soldier (uncredited)
The Two Gladiators (1964)
Revolt of the Praetorians (1964) - Fireflasher (uncredited)
The Magnificent Gladiator (1964) - Attalus' Companion Freeing Emperor (uncredited)
Buffalo Bill, Hero of the Far West (1965) - Cowboy in Saloon (uncredited)
Letti sbagliati (1965) - The Man with the Dog (segment "Il complicato") (uncredited)
Blood for a Silver Dollar (1965)
Two Sergeants of General Custer (1965) - Brawler
Adiós gringo (1965) - Ranchester Cowboy (uncredited)
Bob Fleming... Mission Casablanca (1966) - Brawler (uncredited)
Password: Kill Agent Gordon (1966) - Thug (uncredited)
Knives of the Avenger (1966) - Hagen's Henchman (uncredited)
Yankee (1966)
The Hills Run Red (1966) - Mendez Henchman (uncredited)
Sugar Colt (1966) - Man in Saloon (uncredited)
Thompson 1880 (1966) - Augustine - Brady's henchman
Django Shoots First (1966) - Drunkard (uncredited)
Up the MacGregors! (1967) - Bandit (uncredited)
Wanted (1967) - Hitman (uncredited)
Pecos Cleans Up (1967)
7 pistole per un massacro (1967) - Blacksmith (uncredited)
Son of Django (1967) - Bum, Eyepatch Henchman (uncredited)
Il magnifico Texano (1967) - Stark Henchman (uncredited)
2 RRRingos no Texas (1967) - Sentenza Jane Henchman (uncredited)
Any Gun Can Play (1967) - Montero Gang Member (uncredited)
The Dirty Outlaws (1967) - Piano Player (uncredited)
Bandidos (1967) - Saloon Patron (uncredited)
Face to Face (1967) - Blacksmith of Willow Creek (uncredited)
Red Blood, Yellow Gold (1967) - Bandit in Tavern (uncredited)
Two Faces of the Dollar (1967) - Bandit with the Mexican (uncredited)
Marinai in coperta (1967) - Man with Beard in the Pub (uncredited)
Vengeance Is My Forgiveness (1968) - Juan (uncredited)
Per 100.000 dollari ti ammazzo (1968) - Member of Jurago's gang
A Minute to Pray, a Second to Die (1968) - Fuzzy
Hate Thy Neighbor (1968) - Bearded gangmember (uncredited)
Man Who Cried for Revenge (1968) - Thomas (uncredited)
Run, Man, Run (1968) - Blacksmith of Burton City (uncredited)
The Longest Hunt (1968) - Fuertas
Kill Them All and Come Back Alone (1968) - Soldier (uncredited)
God Will Forgive My Pistol (1969) - Clanton Henchman (uncredited)
Fellini Satyricon (1969) - Soldier Killing the Emperor (uncredited)
The Five Man Army (1969) - Full-Bearded Singing Mexican (uncredited)
The Forgotten Pistolero (1969) - Hitman (uncredited)
Agguato sul Bosforo (1969) - Bearded brawler in bar (uncredited)
Django the Bastard (1969) - Nick / Fuzzy (uncredited)
And God Said to Cain (1970) - Pedro (uncredited)
Chuck Moll (1970) - Flaming Bill (uncredited)
Shango (1970) - Bandit (uncredited)
The Howl (1970) - Cannibal philosopher
Roy Colt & Winchester Jack (1970) - Reverend's Henchman (uncredited)
Chapagua (1970)
Fighters from Ave Maria (1970) - Fighter in Saloon (uncredited)
They Call Me Trinity (1970) - Gioele (uncredited)
Nights and Loves of Don Juan (1971) - One of Aiscia's Wardens (uncredited)
The Scalawag Bunch (1971) - Man at wedding ceremony (uncredited)
His Name Was King (1971) - One of Foster's deputies (uncredited)
Riuscirà l'avvocato Franco Benenato a sconfiggere il suo acerrimo nemico il pretore Ciccio De Ingras? (1971) - Uomo nel saloon (uncredited)
La vacanza (1971) - Olindo
The Price of Death (1971) - Goldseeker (uncredited)
Trinity Is Still My Name (1971) - Hitman (uncredited)
Blackie the Pirate (1971)
Ben and Charlie (1972) - Brawler (uncredited)
Panhandle 38 (1972) - Joe Henchman
Two Brothers in Trinity (1972) - Outlaw #2
Trinity and Sartana Are Coming (1972) - Mexican Soldier at Fort (uncredited)
Two Sons of Trinity (1972) -Chun Chin Champa Henchman (uncredited)
Therefore It Is (1972) - Townsman during Fire (uncredited)
Man of the East (1972) - Brawler (uncredited)
Life Is Tough, Eh Providence? (1972) - James Henchman (uncredited)
100 Fäuste und ein Vaterunser (1972) - Wolf Henchman with Beard (uncredited)
Those Dirty Dogs (1973) - Sergeant in Dormitory Fistfight (uncredited)
Fra' Tazio da Velletri (1973) - Farmer (uncredited)
The Three Musketeers of the West (1973) - Fireeater (uncredited)
Flatfoot (1973) - Thug with Beard (uncredited)
Mean Frank and Crazy Tony (1973) - Thug in Prison (uncredited)
The Fighting Fist of Shanghai Joe (1973) - False Teeth - Ranch Hand
Man with the Golden Winchester (1973) - Soldier (uncredited)
Sgarro alla camorra (1973)
The Arena (1974) - (uncredited)
Watch Out, We're Mad! (1974) - Gymnast (uncredited)
The Hand That Feeds the Dead (1974) - Inn-Keeper
Lover of the Monster (1974) - Polanski
Loaded Guns (1975) - Don Calò Henchman (uncredited)
Flatfoot in Hong Kong (1975) - Cook in street (uncredited)
Carambola's Philosophy: In the Right Pocket (1975) - Photographer (uncredited)
Return of Shanghai Joe (1975) - Hitman (uncredited)
Legend of the Sea Wolf (1975)
The Exorcist: Italian Style (1975) - Uomo al garage di Pasquale (uncredited)
Soldier of Fortune (1976) - Soldato francese (uncredited)
Salon Kitty (1976) - Man with Indian Costume in Salon (uncredited)
The Big Racket (1976) - Sentry (uncredited)
Crime Busters (1977) - Circus Man (uncredited)
Lo chiamavano Bulldozer (1978) - Waiter (uncredited)
The Sheriff and the Satellite Kid (1979) - Party Participant (uncredited)
Caligula (1979) - Giant
Action (1980) - Detenuto (uncredited)
Flatfoot in Egypt (1980) - Temple's Guard (uncredited)
Buddy Goes West (1981) - Lavoratory Worker (uncredited)
Bomber (1982) - Cook (uncredited)
Ator 2 - L'invincibile Orion (1982) - Sandur
Thor the Conqueror (1983) - Barbarian (uncredited)
Pappa e ciccia (1983) - The Head of the Alpini (second story) (uncredited)
The Key (1983)
Rush (1983) - Homer
Miranda (1985) - Man That Sings in Bar (uncredited)
Capriccio (1987) - Serse
Paprika (1991) - Remo
All Ladies Do It (1992) - Passenger on the Bus
Monella (1998)
Senso '45 (2002) - (final film role)

References

External links

1920 births
2016 deaths
Italian male film actors
20th-century Italian male actors
People from Montagnana